This article contains opinion polling by U.S. state for the 2016 Democratic Party presidential primaries. For currency and accuracy, please note the specific dates for each polling as listed below.
For the significance of the earliest state votes, the Iowa caucuses and the New Hampshire primary, see United States presidential primary – Iowa and New Hampshire. To know when any given state votes, see the timeline of primaries and caucuses.

Note: A statistical tie occurs when two data points from within a set are within twice the margin of error of each other. When adding polls remember to double the margin of error provided to see the true result.

Statewide polling

Alabama

Delegate count: 53 Pledged, 7 Unpledged
Winner  Hillary Clinton
Primary date March 1, 2016

Alaska

Delegate count: 16 Pledged, 4 Unpledged
Winner  Bernie Sanders 
Caucus date March 26, 2016

Arizona

Delegate count: 75 Pledged, 10 Unpledged
Winner  Hillary Clinton
Primary date March 22, 2016

Arkansas

Delegate count: 32 Pledged, 5 Unpledged
Winner  Hillary Clinton
Primary date March 1, 2016

California

Delegate count: 475 Pledged, 71 Unpledged
Winner  Hillary Clinton 
Primary date June 7, 2016

Colorado

Delegate count: 66 Pledged, 13 Unpledged
Winner  Bernie Sanders
Caucus date March 1, 2016

Connecticut

Delegate count: 55 Pledged, 15 Unpledged
Winner  Hillary Clinton
Primary date April 26, 2016

Delaware

Delegate count: 21 Pledged, 10 Unpledged
Winner  Hillary Clinton
Primary date April 26, 2016

Florida

Delegate count: 214 Pledged, 32 Unpledged
Winner  Hillary Clinton
Primary date March 15, 2016

Georgia

Delegate count: 102 Pledged, 15 Unpledged
Winner  Hillary Clinton
Primary date March 1, 2016

Hawaii

Delegate count: 53 Pledged, 7 Unpledged
Delegate count: 25 Pledged, 9 Unpledged
Winner  Bernie Sanders
Caucus date March 26, 2016

Idaho

Delegate count: 23 Pledged, 4 Unpledged
Winner  Bernie Sanders
Caucus date March 22, 2016

Illinois

Delegate count: 156 Pledged, 26 Unpledged
Winner   Hillary Clinton 
Primary date March 15, 2016

Indiana

Delegate count: 83 Pledged, 9 Unpledged
Winner  Bernie Sanders 
Primary date May 3, 2016

Iowa

Delegate count: 44 Pledged, 8 Unpledged
Winner  Hillary Clinton 
Caucus date February 1, 2016

Kansas

Delegate count: 33 Pledged, 4 Unpledged
Winner  Bernie Sanders
Caucus date March 5, 2016

Kentucky

Delegate count: 55 Pledged, 5 Unpledged
Winner  Hillary Clinton
Primary date May 17, 2016

Louisiana

Delegate count: 51 Pledged, 8 Unpledged
Winner  Hillary Clinton
Primary date March 5, 2016

Maine

Delegate count: 25 Pledged, 5 Unpledged
Winner  Bernie Sanders
Primary date March 6, 2016

Maryland

Delegate count: 95 Pledged, 23 Unpledged
Winner  Hillary Clinton
Primary date April 26, 2016

Massachusetts

Delegate count: 91 Pledged, 25 Unpledged
Winner  Hillary Clinton
Primary date March 1, 2016

Michigan

Delegate count: 130 Pledged, 17 Unpledged
Winner  Bernie Sanders 
Primary date March 8, 2016

Minnesota

Delegate count: 77 Pledged, 16 Unpledged
Winner  Bernie Sanders
Caucus date March 1, 2016

Mississippi

Delegate count: 36 Pledged, 5 Unpledged
Winner  Hillary Clinton
Primary date March 8, 2016

Missouri

Delegate count: 71 Pledged, 13 Unpledged
Winner  Hillary Clinton 
Primary date March 15, 2016

Montana

Delegate count: 21 Pledged, 6 Unpledged
Winner  Bernie Sanders
Primary date June 7, 2016

Nebraska

Delegate count: 25 Pledged, 5 Unpledged
Winner  Bernie Sanders
Primary date March 5, 2016

Nevada

Delegate count: 35 Pledged, 8 Unpledged
Winner  Hillary Clinton 
Caucus date February 20, 2016

New Hampshire

Delegate count: 24 Pledged, 8 Unpledged
Winner  Bernie Sanders
Primary date February 9, 2016

New Jersey

Delegate count: 126 Pledged, 16 Unpledged
Winner  Hillary Clinton
Primary date June 7, 2016

New Mexico

Delegate count: 34 Pledged, 9 Unpledged
Winner  Hillary Clinton
Primary date June 7, 2016

New York

Delegate count: 247 Pledged, 44 Unpledged
Winner   Hillary Clinton
Primary date April 19, 2016

North Carolina

Delegate count: 107 Pledged, 14 Unpledged
Winner   Hillary Clinton 
Primary date March 15, 2016

North Dakota

Delegate count: 18 Pledged, 5 Unpledged
Winner   Bernie Sanders
Primary date June 7, 2016

Ohio

Delegate count: 143 Pledged, 16 Unpledged
Winner   Hillary Clinton 
Primary date March 15, 2016

Oklahoma

Delegate count: 38 Pledged, 4 Unpledged
Winner  Bernie Sanders
Primary date March 1, 2016

Oregon

Delegate count: 61 Pledged, 13 Unpledged
Winner  Bernie Sanders
Primary date May 17, 2016

Pennsylvania

Delegate count: 189 Pledged, 21 Unpledged
Winner  Hillary Clinton
Primary date April 26, 2016

Rhode Island

Delegate count: 24 Pledged, 9 Unpledged
Winner  Bernie Sanders
Primary date April 26, 2016
Primary Results

South Carolina

Delegate count: 53 Pledged, 6 Unpledged
Winner  Hillary Clinton 
Primary date 27 February 2016

South Dakota

Delegate count: 20 Pledged, 5 Unpledged
Winner  Hillary Clinton
Primary date June 7, 2016

Tennessee

Delegate count: 67 Pledged, 9 Unpledged
Winner  Hillary Clinton
Primary date March 1, 2016

Texas

Delegate count: 222 Pledged, 30 Unpledged
Winner  Hillary Clinton
Primary date March 1, 2016

Utah

Delegate count: 33 Pledged, 4 Unpledged
Winner  Bernie Sanders
Caucus date March 22, 2016

Vermont

Delegate count: 16 Pledged, 10 Unpledged
Winner  Bernie Sanders
Primary date March 1, 2016

Virginia

Delegate count: 95 Pledged, 14 Unpledged
Winner  Hillary Clinton
Primary date March 1, 2016

Washington

Delegate count: 101 Pledged, 17 Unpledged
Winner  Bernie Sanders
Caucus date March 26, 2016

West Virginia

Delegate count: 29 Pledged, 8 Unpledged
Winner  Bernie Sanders
Primary date May 10, 2016

Wisconsin

Delegate count: 86 Pledged, 10 Unpledged
Winner  Bernie Sanders
Primary date April 5, 2016

Wyoming

Delegate count: 14 Pledged, 4 Unpledged
Winner  Bernie Sanders
Caucus date April 9, 2016

District/territories

American Samoa

Delegate count: 6 Pledged, 5 Unpledged
Winner  Hillary Clinton
Primary date March 1, 2016

District of Columbia

Delegate count: 20 Pledged, 26 Unpledged
Winner  Hillary Clinton
Primary date June 14, 2016

Guam

Delegate count: 7 Pledged, 5 Unpledged
Winner  Hillary Clinton
Primary date May 7, 2016

Northern Marianas

Delegate count: 6 Pledged, 5 Unpledged
Winner  Hillary Clinton
Primary date March 1, 2016

Puerto Rico

Delegate count: 60 Pledged, 7 Unpledged
Winner  Hillary Clinton
Primary date June 5, 2016

Virgin Islands

Delegate count: 7 Pledged, 5 Unpledged
Winner  Hillary Clinton
Caucus date June 4, 2016

See also
General election polling
Nationwide opinion polling for the United States presidential election, 2016
Nationwide opinion polling for the United States presidential election by demographics, 2016
Statewide opinion polling for the United States presidential election, 2016

Democratic primary polling
Nationwide opinion polling for the Democratic Party 2016 presidential primaries

Republican primary polling
Nationwide opinion polling for the Republican Party 2016 presidential primaries
Statewide opinion polling for the Republican Party presidential primaries, 2016

Notes

References

Opinion polling for the 2016 United States presidential election
2016 United States Democratic presidential primaries